Vincent is a suburb of Townsville in the City of Townsville, Queensland, Australia.

Geography 
Vincent is bounded by the Bruce Highway (Nathan Street) to the west, Dalrymple Road to the north, Cambridge and Anne Streets to the east, Charles Street to the south. The land use is predominantly residential except for a shopping centre and two schools.

History 
Vincent is situated in the traditional Wulgurukaba Aboriginal country.
The suburb was named on 1 January 1967 after Major William Slade Vincent of the volunteer militia. He was the first commanding officer of the 3rd Queensland Regiment (Kennedy Regiment) based at Kissing Point, Townsville.

The Vincent State School opened on 30 January 1968.

Parts of Vincent suffered major structural and tree damage from a tornado on the morning of 20 March 2012.

Education 
Vincent State School is a government primary (Early Childhood-6) school for boys and girls at 280 Palmerston Street. In 2017, the school had an enrolment of 130 students with 31 teachers (27 full-time equivalent) and 31 non-teaching staff (17 full-time equivalent). It includes a special education program.

Townsville Christian College is a private primary and secondary (Prep-9) school for boys and girls at 210 Palmerston Street. In 2017, the school had an enrolment of 106 students with 7 teachers (6 full-time equivalent) and 10 non-teaching staff (7 full-time equivalent).

References

External links
 

Suburbs of Townsville